Francisco José Carrasco Hidalgo (born 6 March 1959) is a Spanish retired football player and manager.

Nicknamed Lobo, he played as a winger spending most of his 14-year professional career with Barcelona (11 seasons). He won ten major titles with the club including the 1984–85 La Liga and three Cup Winners' Cups.

A Spain international for nine years, Carrasco represented the country at the 1986 World Cup and two European Championships.

Club career
Born in Alcoy, Alicante, Valencian Community, Carrasco was a product of the FC Barcelona youth system, and quickly made a name for himself in La Liga and Europe, with a brilliant display of creative dribbling. Having made his debut with the first team during 1978–79, he also shone in that season's UEFA Cup Winners' Cup final, a 4–3 thriller extra time win against Germany's Fortuna Düsseldorf.

After more than 350 competitive appearances for the Blaugrana, winning the 1984–85 league title, Carrasco spent three seasons with Ligue 1 club FC Sochaux-Montbéliard. He retired after a short stint with UE Figueres, in a return to Catalonia.

Subsequently, Carrasco became a manager: he finished 2005–06 at Atlético Malagueño, with the Andalusia team eventually being relegated from the second division. In the 2007–08 campaign, he coached lowly Real Oviedo.

International career
Having first appeared for Spain in a friendly with Romania on 4 April 1979 (2–2 away draw), Carrasco went on to collect 35 caps with five goals, being selected for UEFA Euro 1980 and 1984 (where he played all five matches for the runners-up, scoring from the penalty kick spot against Romania in another tie, 1–1).

Carrasco was also picked for the squad that appeared in the 1986 FIFA World Cup in Mexico, but did not leave the bench for the eventual quarter-finalists.

Career statistics

Honours
Barcelona
La Liga: 1984–85
Copa del Rey: 1980–81, 1982–83, 1987–88
Supercopa de España: 1983
Copa de la Liga: 1983
UEFA Cup Winners' Cup: 1978–79, 1981–82, 1988–89
European Cup runner-up: 1985–86

Spain
UEFA European Championship runner-up: 1984

Records
Most UEFA Cup Winners' Cup titles: (3) (1978–79, 1981–82, 1988–89)

References

External links

1959 births
Living people
People from Alcoy
Sportspeople from the Province of Alicante
Spanish footballers
Footballers from the Valencian Community
Association football wingers
La Liga players
Segunda División players
FC Barcelona Atlètic players
FC Barcelona players
Terrassa FC footballers
UE Figueres footballers
Ligue 1 players
FC Sochaux-Montbéliard players
Spain youth international footballers
Spain under-21 international footballers
Spain under-23 international footballers
Spain amateur international footballers
Spain international footballers
UEFA Euro 1980 players
UEFA Euro 1984 players
1986 FIFA World Cup players
Spanish expatriate footballers
Expatriate footballers in France
Spanish expatriate sportspeople in France
Spanish football managers
Segunda División managers
Real Oviedo managers